Heidi Burnett (born 16 October 1961) is an Australian judoka. She competed in the women's heavyweight event at the 1996 Summer Olympics.

References

External links
 

1961 births
Living people
Australian female judoka
Olympic judoka of Australia
Judoka at the 1996 Summer Olympics
Sportspeople from Sydney
20th-century Australian women